Family Pictures is a 1993 American made-for-television drama film based on the novel of the same name by Sue Miller. It was directed by Philip Saville and stars Anjelica Huston, Sam Neill, Kyra Sedgwick, and Dermot Mulroney.

Plot
The film opens with Nina Eberlin, the fourth in a family of six children, going to visit her divorced parents. Looking at some old photographs, she begins to tell the story of how her parents, Lainey and David, learned that her younger brother Randall had autism, and how the stress that this placed on them eventually lead to the breakdown of their marriage.

Cast
Anjelica Huston as Lainey Eberlin
Sam Neill as David Eberlin
Kyra Sedgwick as Nina Eberlin
Dermot Mulroney as Mack Eberlin
Jamie Harrold as Randall Eberlin
Lindsay G. Merrithew as Will Price
Anya Alessandroni as Nina (age 3)
Alexandra Petrocci as Nina (age 5-6)
Laura Bertram as Nina (age 12-15)
Jared Wall as Mack (age 4)
Corey Sevier as Mack (age 8)
Sean Ryan as Mack (age 11)
Joshua Ragetlie as Randall (age 2)
Anthony Antonacci as Randall (age 6)
Jared Cook as Randall (age 6)

Accolades
The film earned Anjelica Huston a nomination for Best Actress – Miniseries or Television Film at the 51st Golden Globe Awards. It was also nominated for Outstanding Miniseries and Outstanding Individual Achievement in Writing in a Miniseries or a Special at the 45th Primetime Emmy Awards.

External links

1993 television films
1993 drama films
1993 films
Films directed by Philip Saville
Films about autism
American drama television films
1990s English-language films
1990s American films